The 1956 Railway Cup Hurling Championship was the 30th series of the inter-provincial hurling Railway Cup. Three matches were played between 19 February 1956 and 17 March 1956 to decide the title. It was contested by Connacht, Leinster, Munster and Ulster.

Munster entered the championship as the defending champions.

On 17 March 1956, Leinster won the Railway Cup after a 5-11 to 1-07 defeat of Munster in the final at Croke Park, Dublin. It was their seventh Railway Cup title overall and their first title since 1954.

Leinster's Nicky Rackard was the Railway Cup top scorer with 3-08.

Results

Semi-finals

Final

Top scorers

Overall

Single game

Sources

 Donegan, Des, The Complete Handbook of Gaelic Games (DBA Publications Limited, 2005).

References

Railway Cup Hurling Championship
Railway Cup Hurling Championship